The 1962 South Dakota Coyotes football team was an American football team that represented the University of South Dakota in the North Central Conference (NCC) during the 1962 NCAA College Division football season. In its first season under head coach Bob Burns, the team compiled a 1–9 record (1–5 against NCC opponents), finished in sixth place out of seven teams in the NCC, and was outscored by a total of 265 to 94. The team played its home games at Inman Field in Vermillion, South Dakota.

Schedule

References

South Dakota
South Dakota Coyotes football seasons
South Dakota Coyotes football